Gooteleah "Goo" "Mosa" Arlooktoo (November 28, 1963 – April 30, 2002) was a Canadian politician and former cabinet minister from Northwest Territories, Canada. He briefly served as acting premier of the territory.

Political career
Arlooktoo was first elected to the Northwest Territories legislature in the 1995 Northwest Territories general election. He won the electoral district of Baffin South. In his first term in office he was appointed to the cabinet becoming Minister of Justice and Housing and Deputy Premier.

Arlooktoo became Acting Premier after the sudden resignation of Premier Don Morin who resigned over conflict of interest allegations. He served in this capacity from November 26 until December 10, 1998 when then Legislative Assembly chose Jim Antoine to lead the government.

Arlooktoo left the Northwest Territories legislature when the territory of Nunavut was created to run in the 1999 Nunavut general election. He was considered very likely to become Premier in the new territory, however he was defeated by Olayuk Akesuk in an upset. Arlooktoo himself finished a close second.

Late life
After his defeat for the Nunavut Legislature he became assisted the fledgling government by holding orientations to help train newly elected members in the territory to assist them in performing their duties. He then became Executive Director of the Qikiqtaaluk Wildlife Board which he held until his death in 2002.

He died suddenly of a heart attack at his home at the age of 38 on April 30, 2002. 
Arlooktoo's father Joe Arlooktoo also served as a Member of the Northwest Territories Legislature.

References

External links

1963 births
2002 deaths
Members of the Legislative Assembly of the Northwest Territories
People from Kimmirut
Inuit from the Northwest Territories
Inuit from Nunavut
Inuit politicians